Gabriel Lam Cheuk-wai (born 13 November 1933) is a Roman Catholic priest for the Diocese of Hong Kong.  He was the Vicar Capitular of that diocese from 23 July 1974 to 25 July 1975.  After that, he remained as the vicar general until 1992.  As a former Vicar Capitular and Vicar General, he is entitled to be styled as "The Right Reverend".

Biography
Lam was among 200 guests from Hong Kong to be invited by the Chinese government for the 35th anniversary of the People's Republic of China in 1984.  Thus, he reportedly became the first Catholic official from Hong Kong to be invited by to mainland China since the establishment of the PRC in 1949.  The invitation was originally intended to be for Cardinal John Baptist Wu, the bishop of Hong Kong, but due to his prior commitments in Europe, the diocese recommended Lam as the alternative.

Lam served as sole vicar general from 1975 onwards, and alongside John Baptist Tsang starting in 1985.  Both Lam and Tsang ceased to be vicars general in 1992, when they were assigned to the newly formed positions of Episcopal Vicar for Religious and Episcopal Vicar for Social Services, respectively.  They were succeeded by Dominic Chan and John Tong Hon.

See also
Catholic Diocese of Hong Kong

References

External links
His Biography by the Catholic Church

1933 births
Living people
Hong Kong Roman Catholic priests
Hong Kong people